Doãn Ngọc Tân (born 15 August 1994) is a Vietnamese footballer who plays as a midfielder for V-League (Vietnam) club Thanh Hóa.

Honours

Club
Đông Á Thanh Hóa
Vietnamese National Cup:
 Third place : 2022

References

1994 births
Living people
Vietnamese footballers
Association football midfielders
Haiphong FC players
Thanh Hóa FC players
V.League 1 players